is a Japanese television drama series based on the manga of the same name by Koichi Endo. The screenwriter is Hiroshi Hashimoto who is known for Thermae Romae 2 (2014) and Flying Colors (2015). Satoshi Ohno, who is a member of the Japanese idol group Arashi, played the lead role. Mirei Kiritani also appeared in a supporting role. It received an average viewership rating of 9.7%.

Plot
Shinigami-kun, also known as Shinigami-kun #413, is a rookie grim reaper whose job is to inform people of their impending death and to bring their souls to the spirit world upon their death. He appears with his signature phrase "Congratulations! I'm here to call on you." However, because he is a rookie reaper, he has a tendency to make biased decisions toward the human side, breaking the rule of his world and causing him to get reprimanded by his superior.

Cast

Main cast
 Satoshi Ohno as Shinigami-kun (the reaper)
 Mirei Kiritani as Kanshi-kan (death watcher)
 Masaki Suda as Akuma (devil)
 Yutaka Matsushige as Shunin (supervisor)

Guest appearances
 Riho Takada as Mami Kobayashi (ep.1)
 Shu Watanabe as Naoyuki Sanjō (ep.1)
 Kei Yamamoto as Tomekichi Satō (ep.5)
 Yu Takahashi as Sayaka Kirino (ep.6)
 Tetsuko Kuroyanagi (ep.7)
 Noriko Nakagoshi as Miho Uchida (ep.8)

Episodes

References

External links
  
 

Japanese drama television series
2014 Japanese television series debuts
2014 Japanese television series endings
TV Asahi television dramas